The East Glamorgan General Hospital is a former NHS hospital in Church Village near Pontypridd, Wales.
The building is now occupied by the Priory Hospital Church Village, an adult female hospital specialising in learning disabilities and mental healthcare.

History 
 The hospital opened in 1938 in Church Village.
 During the Second World War it was used by the Royal Air Force.
 In October 1992, Princess Diana opened the Children's centre.
 It was replaced by the Royal Glamorgan Hospital in Talbot Green which was opened in 2000. The "Royal Glam", as it is colloquially known, serves the areas of Pontypridd and the Rhondda.
 The East Glamorgan Hospital has now become The Priory Hospital which offers therapies to women who have learning disabilities and other mental health conditions.

Efficiency 
By the 31st of December 1995, 76% of patients were assessed within five minutes of arrival at the hospital's accident and emergency department and over 90% of casualty patients were given a hospital bed within two hours of the decision time for admission.

References 

Hospitals in Rhondda Cynon Taf